Renato Marazzi (born 30 January 1981) is a Swiss sailor. He competed in the Star event at the 2000 Summer Olympics.

References

External links
 

1981 births
Living people
Swiss male sailors (sport)
Olympic sailors of Switzerland
Sailors at the 2000 Summer Olympics – Star
Place of birth missing (living people)
World Champions in 5.5 Metre
World champions in sailing for Switzerland